Dorcadion bolivari is a species of beetle in the family Cerambycidae. It was described by Lauffer in 1898. It is known from Spain.

See also 
Dorcadion

References

bolivari
Beetles described in 1898